GBL may refer to:

Sports
Golden Baseball League, a defunct North American league
Greater Boston League, a defunct high school athletic conference in Massachusetts, United States
Greater Brisbane League, a baseball league in Queensland, Australia
Greek Basket League, in Greece

Companies
GAMCO Investors, an American financial services company
GB Airways, a defunct British airline
Georgian Bay Line, a defunct American steamship operator
Groupe Bruxelles Lambert, a Belgian holding company

Other uses
Gainsborough Lea Road railway station, in England
Game Based Learning
Game Boy Light, a Japan-exclusive Nintendo handheld
Gamit language
gamma-Butyrolactone
Garden-based learning
Glenn A. Black Laboratory of Archaeology, at Indiana University

See also

 
 GB1 (disambiguation) (disambiguation)
 GBI (disambiguation)